Ekphonetic notation consists of symbols added to certain sacred texts, especially lectionary readings of Biblical texts, as a mnemonic device to assist in their cantillation.  Ekphonetic notation can take a number of forms, and has been used in several Jewish and Christian plainchant traditions, but is most commonly associated with Byzantine chant.  In many cases, the original meaning of ekphonetic neumes is obscure, and must be reconstructed by comparison with later notation. Joseph Huzaya introduced ekphonetic notation into Syriac in the early 6th century.

See also
 Hebrew cantillation

Musical notation